Chained for Life may refer to:
 Chained for Life (1952 film), an exploitation film
 Chained for Life (2019 film), an American drama film